Resorts World Birmingham is an entertainment complex in Birmingham, England.  It has the largest casino in the United Kingdom, shopping mall, restaurants and cinemas.  Construction began in February 2013 and finished in autumn 2015. The Casino is owned by Genting.

The £150 million development in Birmingham's NEC encompasses 50 shops and 18 bars, as well as restaurants, a spa, a cinema and a four star hotel.

The complex (developed by Genting) is seven storeys high and spans 538,000 square feet (50,000 square meters). Its design is based on the shape of a cruise ship.

Resorts World Birmingham is the first Resorts World in Europe. The Birmingham complex was predicted to boost the regional economy by £33 million per annum, and create 1,100 new jobs.

Hotel
The four-star hotel has 182 rooms and six five-star suites. Designs were overseen by a Feng Shui master in Malaysia, and bathrooms were imported from Italy.

Casino
Genting was awarded a large casino licence in June 2011 by Solihull Council, and granted planning permission in 2012. The casino, which takes up 11% of the overall site, is open 24 hours.

The games available include slot machines, roulette, black jack and other traditional casino games, along with poker rooms.

Shopping
The covered shopping village comprising 50 stores sits along two arcs at the base of Resorts World. Some of the shops are Ben Sherman, Carhartt, Hallmark Cards, Kurt Geiger, Levi's, Lindt, Next, Nike, Skechers, Sony, The North Face, The Works, Trespass, Vans, WHSmith and many more. The shopping floor has now been downsized due to the amount of empty units. A Hollywood Bowl and escape room now occupy a majority of the empty retail unit space. There are also two coffee shops Costa Coffee and Starbucks (located inside cinema).

Cinema
The Cineworld cinema has a total of 1,782 seats and 11 screens. Eight out of the 11 screens have 3D capabilities.

The largest theatre has 282 seats, and marks the region's first purpose-built IMAX screen in a multiplex cinema. It is one of three IMAX screens in Birmingham.

Conference centre
The Vox facility can hold 900 delegates or guests, and can be separated into five separate halls, for either ceremonies or conferences.

Resorts World Arena

The Resorts World Arena (previously The NEC Arena, LG Arena and Genting Arena) is part of the NEC and Resorts World complex.

References

External links

Casinos in England
Hotels in Birmingham, West Midlands
Buildings and structures in Birmingham, West Midlands